This is a list of ethnobotanists.

 Isabella Abbott
 Robert Bye
 Michael Jeffrey Balick
 Paul Alan Cox
 Tony Cunningham
 Wade Davis
 John de la Parra
 James A. Duke
 Nina Etkin
 Maria Fadiman
 Erna Gunther
 Kathleen Harrison
 John William Harshberger
 Dennis McKenna
 Terence McKenna
 Gary Paul Nabhan
 Jonathan Ott
 Keewaydinoquay Peschel
 Luigi Piacenza
 Andrea Pieroni
 Mark Plotkin
 Timothy Plowman
 Cassandra L. Quave
 Jan Salick
 Giorgio Samorini
 Richard Evans Schultes
Merlin Sheldrake
 Daniel Siebert
 Constantino Manuel Torres
 Nancy Turner
 Ina Vandebroek
 Gustav Vilbaste
 R. Gordon Wasson
 Ulrich Willerding
 Arthur Whistler
 James Wong
 Charles Bixler Heiser
Norman Farnsworth

See also 
 Ethnobotany

 
Ethnobotanists